William "Rookie" Theron Davis (born April 29, 1993) is an American former professional baseball pitcher. He has played in Major League Baseball (MLB) for the Cincinnati Reds and Pittsburgh Pirates.

Career

New York Yankees
Davis attended Dixon High School in Holly Ridge, North Carolina. As a 15-year-old in early 2009, he committed to play college baseball at East Carolina University. Davis was drafted by the New York Yankees in the 14th round of the 2011 Major League Baseball Draft. He signed with the Yankees instead of attending East Carolina. He made his professional debut in 2012 with the Gulf Coast Yankees. In 2013, he pitched for the Staten Island Yankees and Charleston RiverDogs and spent 2014 with Charleston. He started 2015 with the Tampa Yankees. The Yankees added him to their 40-man roster after the season.

Cincinnati Reds
On December 28, 2015, Davis was traded to the Reds with Caleb Cotham, Tony Renda, and Eric Jagielo in exchange for Aroldis Chapman. Davis made the Reds' Opening Day roster in 2017 and made his major league debut on April 6 against the Phillies.

Davis picked up his first major league win on May 3, pitching 5 scoreless innings over the Pirates in a 7–2 win.

He was outrighted to AAA on August 27, 2018, and became a free agent at the conclusion of the season.

Pittsburgh Pirates
On February 18, 2019, Davis signed a minor league deal with the Pittsburgh Pirates and was invited to spring training. His contract was purchased on May 25. On September 1, Davis was outrighted off the Pirates roster and he elected free agency following the season.

Personal life
Rookie got engaged to his fiancé Allison Fisher on September 28, 2019. Davis' father, Billy, also attended Dixon High School, and played college baseball for Louisburg College. His older sisters, Lauren and Ayrien, both played softball and basketball at Dixon.

References

External links

1993 births
Living people
People from Onslow County, North Carolina
Baseball players from North Carolina
Major League Baseball pitchers
Cincinnati Reds players
Pittsburgh Pirates players
Gulf Coast Yankees players
Staten Island Yankees players
Charleston RiverDogs players
Tampa Yankees players
Trenton Thunder players
Pensacola Blue Wahoos players
Louisville Bats players
Indianapolis Indians players
Arizona League Reds players
Daytona Tortugas players